The British Academy consists of world-leading scholars and researchers in the humanities and social sciences. Each year, it elects fellows to its membership. The following were elected in the 1940s.

1940 
 Dr Z. N. Brooke
 Rev. M. P. Charlesworth
 Professor V. Gordon Childe
 Sir Cyril Fox
 C. J. Gadd
 Dr E. Prestage
 Professor D. S. Robertson
 Dr W. A. Shaw
 Lord Wright

1941 
 J. Allan
 Dr A. B. Cook
 Dr A. C. Ewing
 Professor E. Fraenkel
 T. D. Kendrick
 F. J. E. Raby
 K. Sisam
 Sidney Smith
 Professor H. T. Wade-Gery
 Dr R. E. Mortimer Wheeler

1942 
 Dr E. R. Bevan
 Professor E. R. Dodds
 Dr J. L. le B. Hammond
 Professor J. R. Hicks
 Professor L. C. Robbins
 E. S. G. Robinson
 Professor R. L. Turner

1943 
 Christopher Dawson
 J. Goronwy Edwards
 A. S. F. Gow
 Professor Battiscombe Gunn
 Professor H. H. Price
 Professor F. P. Wilson

1944 
 Dr C. K. Allen
 Professor H. W. Bailey
 G. Caton Thompson
 Professor H. A. R. Gibb
 Professor F. A. von Hayek
 Dr F. E. Hutchinson
 Dr W. H. S. Jones
 Professor R. A. B. Mynors
 Professor L. B. Namier
 Dr F. Saxl
 Ronald Syme
 Harold Williams

1945 
 Professor B. H. Sumner
 Helen Cam
 Professor T. W. Manson
 A. D. Waley
 Sir R. O. Winstedt
 E. F. Carritt
 Professor G. C. Cheshire
 Professor A. J. B. Wace

1946 
 Sir A. Carr-Saunders
 Rev. C. H. Dodd
 Professor S. R. K. Glanville
 Professor R. Hackforth
 Professor E. F. Jacob
 H. Mattingly
 Professor H. J. Paton
 Professor T. F. T. Plucknett
 Professor W. L. Renwick
 Professor E. Ll. Woodward

1947 
 Sir E. Barker
 O. G. S. Crawford
 Professor K. A. C. Creswell
 H. Darbishire
 Sir C. Flower
 Professor A. W. Gomme
 R. F. Harrod
 Professor A. H. M. Jones
 Professor M. D. Knowles
 I. A Richmond
 C. H. Roberts
 Professor H. H. Rowley
 Rev. J. M. Thompson
 Professor B. Willey

1948 
 Professor Sir Reginald Coupland
 Professor G. C. Field
 Professor C. F. C. Hawkes
 Professor Sir Hubert Henderson
 Dr P. E. Kahle
 Rev. Dr W. L. Knox
 Professor H. Lauterpacht
 W. A. Pantin
 Professor R. Pares
 Rev. Professor C. E. Raven
 Professor Leon Roth
 Dr J. V. Scholderer
 F. Wormald

1949 
 Professor A. J. Arberry
 Dr R. W. Chapman
 Sir Kenneth Clark
 Professor David Douglas
 Professor R. W. Firth
 Rev. Dr W. F. Howard
 Professor J. E. Neale
 Dr Rudolf Pfeiffer
 A. E. Popham

See also 
 Fellows of the British Academy

References 
The above names are taken from the British Academy Annual Reports, found in the Proceedings of the British Academy for the years 1940 to 1949.